Kenneth Lee Henderson is an American politician. He served as a Republican member for the 71st district of the Arkansas House of Representatives.

Henderson attended Benton High School and the University of Arkansas at Little Rock, where he earned a Bachelor of Science degree in finance. In 2015, Henderson won the election for the 71st district of the Arkansas House of Representatives. He succeeded Andrea Lea. Henderson was succeeded by Joe Cloud for the 71st district in 2019. He has been vice president for the company Commercial Lending, and worked as a real estate developer in Russellville, Arkansas.

References 

Living people
Place of birth missing (living people)
Year of birth missing (living people)
Republican Party members of the Arkansas House of Representatives
21st-century American politicians
University of Arkansas at Little Rock alumni
American real estate businesspeople